Temporada de patos (released as Duck Season in the United States) is a 2004 Mexican film. It is the first feature film by writer/director, Fernando Eimbcke, a former MTV Awards videoclip director.

After being successfully featured in national and international film festivals such as the Cannes Film Festival it was sold to distributors in six European countries. The movie has been praised in all of these festivals as well as by directors such as Alfonso Cuarón (Gravity) and Guillermo del Toro (Pacific Rim).

The movie is filmed in black and white and mostly takes place in one location, an old apartment in Tlatelolco.

Cast
Daniel Miranda as Flama
Diego Cataño as Moko
Danny Perea as Rita
Enrique Arreola as Ulises
Carolina Politi as Flama's mother

Plot
Flama and Moko are two 14-year-old boys who have been friends for a long time. One Sunday afternoon, Flama invites Moko to play videogames while his mother is not home. There they have everything they need to entertain themselves: videogames, pizza delivery, sodas, manga pornography and... no parents. But when the power goes out what seemed like a regular day becomes an adventure.

Awards
2004 AFI Fest, Grand Jury Prize for Fernando Eimbcke
2004 Guadalajara Film Festival, FIPRESCI Prize for Fernando Eimbcke
2004 Guadalajara Film Festival, Mayahuel Award - Best Actor for Enrique Arreola (Tied with Roberto Espejo for Puños rosas)
2004 Guadalajara Film Festival, Mayahuel Award - Best Actress for Danny Perea
2004 Guadalajara Film Festival, Mayahuel Award - Best Director for Fernando Eimbcke
2004 Guadalajara Film Festival, Mayahuel Award - Best Original Score for Alejandro Rosso
2004 Guadalajara Film Festival, Mayahuel Award - Best Screenplay for Fernando Eimbcke, Paula Markovitch
2004 Guadalajara Film Festival, Mayahuel Award - Best Sound Design for Lena Esquenazi
2004 Thessaloniki Film Festival - Best Director for Fernando Eimbcke
2005 Ariel Award, Golden Ariel
2005 Ariel Award, Silver Ariel - Best Actor for Enrique Arreola
2005 Ariel Award, Silver Ariel - Best Actress for Danny Perea
2005 Ariel Award, Silver Ariel - Best Art Direction for Diana Quiroz, Luisa Guala
2005 Ariel Award, Silver Ariel - Best Cinematography for Alexis Zabe
2005 Ariel Award, Silver Ariel - Best Direction for Fernando Eimbcke
2005 Ariel Award, Silver Ariel - Best Editing for Mariana Rodríguez
2005 Ariel Award, Silver Ariel - Best First Work - Fiction for Fernando Eimbcke
2005 Ariel Award, Silver Ariel - Best Original Score for Alejandro Rosso, Liquits
2005 Ariel Award, Silver Ariel - Best Screenplay Written Directly for the Screen for Fernando Eimbcke
2005 Ariel Award, Silver Ariel - Best Sound for Lena Esquenazi, Miguel Hernández and Antonio Diego
2005 MTV Movie Awards Mexico, Favorite Actress for Danny Perea
2005 Paris Film Festival, Special Jury Prize for Fernando Eimbcke

External links
Warner Independent's Duck Season site

Duck Season on Yahoo! Movies

2004 films
2004 comedy films
Best First Work Ariel Award winners
Best Picture Ariel Award winners
Films directed by Fernando Eimbcke
2000s Spanish-language films
Warner Independent Pictures films
Mexican comedy films
2000s Mexican films